Docohammus is a genus of longhorn beetles of the subfamily Lamiinae, containing the following species:

 Docohammus bennigseni Aurivillius, 1908
 Docohammus flavescens Breuning, 1938
 Docohamus orientalis Breuning, 1986

References

Lamiini